Oldmans Township Airport  is a public use airport located two nautical miles (3.7 km) south of the central business district of Pedricktown, in Oldmans Township, Salem County, New Jersey, United States. It is privately owned by Oldmans Township Airport Authority, Inc. The airport was known as Old Mans Airport until it was renamed in 2001 to Spitfire Aerodrome, after being purchased by Spitfire Aerospace Technologies, Inc., until 2021.

Facilities and aircraft 
It has one asphalt paved runway designated 7/25 which measures 2,419 by 60 feet (737 x 18 m).

For the 12-month period ending April 21, 2008, the airport had 16,971 general aviation aircraft operations, an average of 46 per day. At that time there were 37 aircraft based at this airport: 70% single-engine, 27% helicopter and 3% multi-engine.

References

External links
 

Airports in New Jersey
Oldmans Township, New Jersey
Transportation buildings and structures in Salem County, New Jersey